Sweitzer Lake is a lake in Hubbard County, in the U.S. state of Minnesota.

Sweitzer Lake was named for an early settler.

See also
List of lakes in Minnesota

References

Lakes of Minnesota
Lakes of Hubbard County, Minnesota